The 2021–22 Premier League was a professional association football league season in England.

2021–22 Premier League may also refer to:

Association football
 2021–22 Armenian Premier League
 2021–22 Bahraini Premier League
 2021–22 Premier League of Bosnia and Herzegovina
 2021–22 Egyptian Premier League
 2021–22 Ghana Premier League
 2021–22 Iraqi Premier League
 2021–22 Israeli Premier League
 2021–22 Lebanese Premier League
 2021–22 Maltese Premier League
 2021–22 Russian Premier League
 2021–22 Ukrainian Premier League
 2021–22 Welsh Premier League

Basketball
 2021–22 Israeli Basketball Premier League

Cricket
 2021–22 Bangladesh Premier League
 2022 Indian Premier League